Namik Paul (born 19 September 1987) is an Indian actor who primarily works in Hindi television. He made his acting debut in 2015 with Qubool Hai portraying Ahsaan. He earned recognition with his portrayal of Shravan Malhotra in Ek Duje Ke Vaaste and his dual portrayal of Shiv Kapoor and Krish Khanna in Ek Deewaana Tha.

Paul made his web debut with Bindass's web series The Trip portraying Adil Malik in 2016. Since February 2023, he is seen portraying Shiv Dhoopar and Aniket Dhoopar in Lag Ja Gale.

Early life and education 
Paul was born on 19 September 1987 in Dehradun, Uttrakhand. He completed his schooling from Woodstock School, Mussoorie, Uttarakhand and graduated from Lewis & Clark College, Oregon. He started his career as a journalist with NDTV 24x7, but left the job due to erratic schedule and later took up acting.

Career 
Paul made his acting debut in 2015 with Qubool Hai portraying Ahsaan opposite Additi Gupta. 

Paul portrayed Shravan Malhotra in Ek Duje Ke Vaaste opposite Nikita Dutta in 2016. It proved as a major turning point in his career. He received Gold Award for Debut in a Lead Role - Male nomination for his performance. He also hosted Befikre Belgium Ke with Loveleen Kaur Sasan in the same year.

From 2016 to 2017, he portrayed Adil Malik opposite Lisa Hayden in Bindass's web series The Trip, marking his web debut. In 2017, he hosted Aye Zindagi.

Paul received wider recognition with his portrayal of Shiv Kapoor in Ek Deewaana Tha opposite Donal Bisht from 2017 to 2018. In 2018, he portrayed Krish Khanna opposite Bisht post the leap in the show. He received Gold Best Onscreen Jodi nomination with Bisht.

He portrayed Angad Jindal in Kavach... Maha Shivratri opposite Deepika Singh in 2019.

In 2020, he portrayed Viraj Bhardwaj in Kasautii Zindagii Kay opposite Erica Fernandes.

Post a hiatus of 2 years, Paul made his comeback with Lag Ja Gale. He is seen portraying Shiv Dhoopar and Aniket Dhoopar opposite Tanisha Mehta since February 2023.

Filmography

Television

Web series

Awards and nominations

See also 
 List of Indian television actors

References

External links 
 
 Official site

Living people
Male actors in Hindi television
Indian male models
Indian male film actors
21st-century Indian male actors
Indian male soap opera actors
Indian male television actors
1987 births